Can You Dig This is a 2015 American documentary film directed by Delila Vallot. The main focus of this film is urban farming as the main character plants a food garden in his home.

Synopsis 
The story is an inspiration one that aims to motivate people everywhere to plant as the lead character plants an urban garden in his home in South Central Los Angeles.

Reception 
 African Movie Academy Awards (2016) — Best Diaspora Documentary [Nominated]
 Los Angeles Film Festival (2015) — LA Muse Award

References

External links
 

Urban agriculture
2010s English-language films